August Voldemar Siiak (7 February 1878 Vohnja Parish (now Kadrina Parish), Wierland County – ?) was an Estonian politician. He was a member of II Riigikogu, representing the Christian People's Party. He was a member of the Riigikogu since 23 March 1926. He replaced Konstantin Tamm-Stamm.

References

1878 births
Year of death missing
People from Kadrina Parish
People from Kreis Wierland
Christian People's Party (Estonia) politicians
Members of the Riigikogu, 1923–1926